The Seattle Mariners have completed 45 seasons of professional baseball in the West division of Major League Baseball (MLB)'s American League (AL) since they began play in 1977. From April 6, 1977 until June 27, 1999, the Mariners played in Seattle's Kingdome. Since July 15, 1999, the Mariners have played at T-Mobile Park (formerly Safeco Field). Their name reflects their home city's coastal and marine culture.

An expansion team created as a result of a breach of contract lawsuit involving the Seattle Pilots' 1969 departure after just one year in Seattle, the Mariners finished each of their first fourteen seasons with a losing record. When the drought ended in 2022, it was longest active drought in MLB and in all of the major league North American sports.

Table Key

Regular season results

Record by decade 
The following table describes the Mariners' MLB win–loss record by decade.

These statistics are from Baseball-Reference.com's Seattle Mariners History & Encyclopedia, and are current as of October 3, 2021.

Postseason record by year
The Mariners have made the postseason five times in their history, with their first being in 1995 and the most recent being in 2022.

See also
 List of Seattle Mariners managers
 List of Seattle Mariners Opening Day starting pitchers
 Seattle Mariners team records

Footnotes

In both the 1980 and 1981 seasons, the Mariners played one game which ended in a tie not reflected in the above table. On June 2, 1980, in Detroit, the Mariners were tied with the Tigers 3–3 after 13 innings; the game was suspended due to rain and never replayed because neither team was in playoff contention. On April 29, 1981, the Mariners played an 8 inning game with the Minnesota Twins that was called due to rain with the score tied at 7; it was also never replayed. In 2007, the Major League Baseball Rules Committee announced that tied games would no longer be replayed from the start but instead suspended and resumed.

The 1981 Major League Baseball strike caused the season to be split into two halves.
The 1994–95 Major League Baseball strike, which started on August 12, led to the cancellation of the playoffs and World Series. As a result of the abbreviated season, MLB did not officially award division championships. Although they spent the entire shortened season with a losing record, the Mariners held first place in their division before ten games until as late as May 25, when three of the four AL West teams were tied.
The team's 116 wins tied a major-league record initially held by the 1906 Chicago Cubs. However, the Mariners played ten more games than the 1906 Cubs.

References
General

Specific

 
Seattle Mariners
Seasons